Lieutenant-General Sir George Harris Lea (28 December 1912 – 27 December 1990) KCB, DSO, MBE was a British Army officer who fought in the Second World War, notably at the Battle of Arnhem, and later became Head of the British Defence Staff in Washington, D.C.

Military career
Educated at Charterhouse School and the Royal Military College, Sandhurst, Lea was commissioned into the Lancashire Fusiliers in 1933.

He served in the Second World War as brigade major of the 4th Parachute Brigade and then as commanding officer of 11th Battalion, Parachute Regiment. In this role he saw action during Operation Market Garden and became a prisoner of war.

After attending the Staff College, Camberley, Lea became commanding officer of the Special Air Service in 1955 and saw action again in Malaya. He went on to be commander of 2nd Infantry Brigade in 1957, deputy military secretary in 1960 and General Office Commanding 42nd (Lancashire) Division/District of the Territorial Army in 1962. He was given command of the armed forces in Northern Rhodesia and Nyasaland in 1963 and became director of operations in Borneo in the spring of 1965, just before a pivotal battle with Indonesia at Plaman Mapu during the Indonesia-Malaysia confrontation. His last appointment was as head of the British Defence Staff in Washington, D.C. in 1967 before retiring in 1970.

In retirement Lea was Lieutenant of the Tower of London.

References

External links
1st British Airborne Division officers

 

|-

|-

1912 births
1990 deaths
Military personnel from Worcestershire
People educated at Charterhouse School
Knights Commander of the Order of the British Empire
Companions of the Distinguished Service Order
Members of the Order of the British Empire
Lancashire Fusiliers officers
British Army lieutenant generals
British military attachés
British Army personnel of World War II
Operation Market Garden
British Parachute Regiment officers
Graduates of the Royal Military College, Sandhurst
British World War II prisoners of war
World War II prisoners of war held by Germany
People from Kidderminster
British Army personnel of the Malayan Emergency
Lieutenants of the Tower of London
British Army personnel of the Indonesia–Malaysia confrontation
Special Air Service officers
Royal Regiment of Fusiliers officers
Graduates of the Staff College, Camberley